Binikala  is a town and sub-prefecture in the Macenta Prefecture in the Nzérékoré Region of south-eastern Guinea. As of the 2016 census, Binikala has a population of 10,884,958.

References

Sub-prefectures of the Nzérékoré Region